Heewon Entertainment Co, Ltd. is a South Korea's toy, animation and entertainment company. headquartered in Guro-Dong Guro-Gu Seoul, Korea. established in 1994. It is a Korean animation and Japanese animation products. also produces an anime review entertainment, Korea; as well as a Korean-language version of Battle Beadman, Fire Beadman and Beyblade animation, and a called Jang Geum's Dream. It used to other animation, and featured storylines inappropriate for Chokomi, though not animated entertainment (see Anime).

Heewon's animates were confined to South Korea until a contract with based Korean animation group. The contract allowed animation works. to distribute Fire Beadman, Battle Beadman and Jang Geum's Dream in Korea. who hold a 50% stake in Heewon. A final contract in 2000, signed with BROCCOLI, a Japanese company, meant that Di Gi Cahrat was now available in animated sponsorship regions.

It is jointly owned by world animation helpers Sonokong, Munhwa Broadcasting Corporation, KBS, SBS, BROCCOLI.

Group companies
Heewon Art Flower
Heewon's Beyblades

Productions

Made in Korea
Jang Geum's Dream (MBC)
Fire Beadman (KBS)
Juka Juka
The Sweet Little Comi (MBC)
Turning Mecard (KBS)
Viva Music
Road To Friendship (MBC)
Dragon Rising (MBC)
Animal Academy (MBC)
Legendary Detective (Netflix)
Choro The Pro Fighter (Netflix)

Assistant production
Di Gi Charat (BROCCOLI, Japan)
Littlest Pet Shop (Sunbow Productions, USA)
B-Daman (Magicverse, Japan)
Law of Sun (Tack, Japan)
Full Moon (Studio Deen, Japan)
Beyblade (SBS)
Battle Beadman (KBS, Japan)
Element Hunters (NHK Enterprises, Japan)

See also
Sonokong
Contemporary culture of South Korea
Korean animation
List of South Korean companies

External links
Heewon Entertainment Homepage
Di Gi Charat Korea Homepage
Heewon Art Flower Homepage

South Korean animation studios
Entertainment companies of South Korea
Mass media companies established in 1994
Toy companies of South Korea
Toy companies established in 1994
South Korean companies established in 1994